Stadio Nuovo Romagnoli is a sports stadium located in Campobasso, the capital of the Molise region of Italy. It is primarily used for association football. The stadium currently hosts the home matches of S.S. Campobasso who play in the Serie C.

History

The Stadio Nuovo Romagnoli was designed by former Ascoli Calcio 1898 chairman Constantino Rozzi, who also designed numerous other stadiums across Italy. Work started on the stadium in 1983, and Stadio Nuovo Romagnoli was officially opened on 13 February 1985, when Campobasso defeated Juventus F.C. 1-0 in a Coppa Italia match.

The structure of the stadium is very similar to that of the Stadio Ciro Vigorito in Benevento, due to the same project and some of the same architects being involved in the Romagnoli's design. The stadium is called "New Romagnoli" because Campobasso's previous stadium was named after Giovanni Romagnoli. However, the stadium has not yet received an official name. There has been talk of naming the stadium after Michele Scorrano, Campobasso's captain in the 1970s and 1980s, who died after a heart attack in February 2009.

After S.S.C. Napoli's Stadio San Paolo was damaged by a violent storm, Stadio Nuovo Romagnoli hosted the club's home matches between September 2001 and January 2002.

On 3 June 2003, the stadium hosted a friendly match between Italy and Northern Ireland, which Italy won 2-0. The game was organized to raise funds for reconstruction and victims after an earthquake hit Molise, where the stadium is based, in 2002.

After S.S. Campobasso was taken under new ownership in 2018, the Stadium was given some upgrades including painting the seats with red and blue stripes. As well as upgrades to various other areas.

Concerts
 Antonello Venditti, 22 September 1990
 Litfiba, 30 August 1991
 Pino Daniele, 28 July 1997
 Subsonica, 26 September 2002

References

Football venues in Italy
Multi-purpose stadiums in Italy
Campobasso
Sports venues in Molise
Buildings and structures in the Province of Campobasso